The 2021 Polish speedway season was the 2021 season of motorcycle speedway in Poland.

Individual

Polish Individual Speedway Championship
The 2021 Individual Speedway Polish Championship was the 2021 version of Polish Individual Speedway Championship organised by the Polish Motor Union (PZM). The Championship was won by double world champion Bartosz Zmarzlik. The final was held at Stadion im. Alfreda Smoczyka in Leszno on 11 July 2021.

Golden Helmet
The 2021 Golden Golden Helmet organised by the Polish Motor Union (PZM) was the 2021 event for the league's leading riders. The final was held at Zielona Góra on the 21 June. Bartosz Zmarzlik won the Golden Helmet for the second successive season.

U21 Championship
 winner Jakub Miśkowiak

Silver Helmet
 winner - Jakub Miśkowiak

Bronze Helmet
 winner - Mateusz Cierniak

Pairs

Polish Pairs Speedway Championship
The 2021 Polish Pairs Speedway Championship was the 2021 edition of the Polish Pairs Speedway Championship. The final was held on 3 September at Grudziądz

Team

Team Speedway Polish Championship
The 2021 Team Speedway Polish Championship was the 2021 edition of the Team Polish Championship. WTS Sparta Wrocław won the Ekstraliga and were awarded the gold medal and declared Polish Team Champions. The team finishing second and third were awarded silver and bronze medals respectively.

TZ Ostrovia Ostrów Wielkopolski won the 1. Liga and Landshut Devils won the 2. Liga. German team Landshut Devils joined 2. Liga due to problems with the German leagues in connection to COVID-19 pandemic.

Ekstraliga

Quarter-finals

Semi-finals

Final

1. Liga

Semi-finals

Final

2. Liga

Semi-finals
											
Final

References

Speedway leagues
Professional sports leagues in Poland
Polish
speedway